The 2013–14 UAE Pro League, known as the Arabian Gulf League for sponsorship reasons, is the 39th top-level football season in the United Arab Emirates, and the sixth professional season. Fourteen teams participate, once again with Al Ain as the defending champions after winning the previous two seasons.

The league started on 14 September and finished on 11 May 2014 in accordance with FIFA guidelines ahead of the 2014 World Cup in Brazil.

The league was previously known as the Pro League. Starting from the 2013–14 season the name was changed to UAE Arabian Gulf League. The name change has been viewed as a revival of the Persian Gulf naming dispute with Iran accusing the United Arab Emirates of racism, and the Football Federation of the Islamic Republic of Iran barring the transfer of Javad Nekounam to a UAE club.

Teams

Stadia and locations

Al Ain moved into their new stadium, the Hazza Bin Zayed Stadium on the 16th matchday.

Managerial changes
Managerial changes during the 2013-14 campaign.

Foreign players
The number of foreign players is restricted to four per AGL team.

Note:
^1 Foreign players who left their clubs after first half of the season;
^2 Injury Replacement Players;

League table

Results

References

UAE Pro League seasons
United
1